Mandilan-e Bala (also Romanized as Mandīlān-e Bālā; also known as Mandīlān) is a village in Jahanabad Rural District, in the Central District of Hirmand County, Sistan and Baluchestan Province, Iran. At the 2006 census, its population was 64, in 15 families.

References 

Populated places in Hirmand County